Martin Penrose is a Gaelic footballer for the Tyrone county team. He won two All-Ireland Senior Football Championships with his county.

Penrose plays club football for Carrickmore, although, until recently, he played with Aghyaran St Davog's, Achadh Uí Aráin Naoimh Dabhóige.

Honours
 3 Ulster Senior Football Championships (2007, 2009, 2010)
 2 All-Ireland Senior Football Championships (2005, 2008)
 4 Dr McKenna Cups (2005, 2006, 2007, 2012)
 2 Ulster Under-21 Football Championships (2003, 2004)
 1 Ulster Minor Football Championship (2001)
 1 All-Ireland Minor Football Championship (2001)

References

Year of birth missing (living people)
Living people
Aghyaran St Davog's Gaelic footballers
Carrickmore St Colmcille's Gaelic footballers
Donegal Boston Gaelic footballers
Tyrone inter-county Gaelic footballers